Kantilal Vardichand "Kanti" Mardia  (born 1935) is an Indian-British statistician specialising in directional statistics, multivariate analysis, geostatistics, statistical bioinformatics and statistical shape analysis. He was born in Sirohi, Rajasthan, India in a Jain family and now resides and works in Leeds. He is known for his series of tests of multivariate normality based measures of multivariate skewness and kurtosis as well as work on the statistical measures of shape.

Life and career
Mardia was educated at the Ismail Yusuf College at the University of Bombay (BSc 1955, MSc in statistics 1957), the University of Poona (MSc in pure mathematics 1961), the University of Rajasthan (PhD 1965) and the University of Newcastle Upon Tyne (PhD 1967, DSc 1973). He held academic positions at the Institute of Science, Mumbai and the University of Hull.

Mardia was appointed professor of applied statistics and head of the Department of Statistics in the School of Mathematics at the University of Leeds in 1973.  He retired in 2000 with the title emeritus professor and is currently senior research professor of applied statistics at Leeds. He is also a long-term visiting professor at the University of Oxford, from March 2013, and the Indian Institute of Management Ahmedabad (IIMA), from 2008.

He was instrumental in founding the Centre of Medical Imaging Research (CoMIR) in the University of Leeds, where he held the position of joint director. He was the driving force behind the exchange programs between Leeds and other scholarly centres such as the University of Granada, Spain, and the Indian Statistical Institute, Calcutta. He has written several scholarly books and edited conference proceedings and other special volumes.

In 1973, Mardia founded the University of Leeds Annual Statistics Research Workshops (LASR) which have run for most years and he has edited all the proceedings. These workshops attract an international audience and focus on applied statistical topics especially those involving shape and images, and more recently, bioinformatics.

In 2003, he was awarded the Guy Medal in Silver by the Royal Statistical Society.

In 2013, he was awarded the Wilks Memorial Award by the American Statistical Association.

In 2019, he was awarded the Lifetime Achievement Award by the International Indian Statistical Association.

In 2020, he was awarded the Mahatma Gandhi Medal of Honour by the NRI Institute.

In 2021, he received the OneJAIN Life Achievement Award from the Jain All-Party Parliamentary Group.

The 40th Fisher Memorial Lecture was given by Professor Mardia on 18 November 2022 at the Oxford Mathematical Institute.

He is a practicing Jain and strict vegetarian. His 1990 book The Scientific Foundations of Jainism introduced the Four Noble Truths of Jains. He is the founding and current chairman of the Yorkshire Jain Foundation.

Mardia was appointed Officer of the Order of the British Empire (OBE) in the 2023 New Year Honours for services to statistical science.

Books
Families of Bivariate Distributions (1970)
Multivariate Analysis, coauthored with John T. Kent and John Bibby (1979)
Directional Statistics, coauthored with Peter Jupp, (1999) (first published under the title Statistics of Directional Data, 1972)
Bayesian Methods in Structural Bioinformatics, co-edited with Thomas Hamelryck and Jesper Ferkinghoff-Borg (2012)
Statistical Shape Analysis, coauthored with Ian L. Dryden (2016) (first edition 1998)
Spatial Analysis, coauthored with John T. Kent (2022)
The Scientific Foundations of Jainism (1990)
Living Jainism: An Ethical Science, coauthored with Aidan Rankin (2013)

Mardia Prize 
The Mardia Prize (founded by Kantilal Mardia) is awarded by the Royal Statistical Society. This award is given annually/biennially to support interdisciplinary workshops. The aim of these workshops is to bring together statisticians and other science communities who can help in developing new interdisciplinary area and maintain a sustained focus. The first award was inaugurated in 2016 (Topic:  renewable natural resources management, food security, climate change and the illegal wildlife trade) with the second in 2018 (Topic:  extreme weather research) and the third in 2019 (Topic: economics of mental health).

References

External links
Home page at Leeds University
Review of the LASR on the occasion of Mardias 65th Birthday by Fred Bookstein.
Yorkshire Jain Foundation
In Conversation with Prof. Kanti V. Mardia . . . in Research Newsletter of the Indian Institute of Management, Ahmedabad.  February 2009.

Directional statistics
Savitribai Phule Pune University alumni
University of Rajasthan alumni
University of Mumbai alumni
Alumni of Newcastle University
Academics of the University of Hull
Academics of the University of Leeds
Fellows of the American Statistical Association
Living people
1935 births
People from Sirohi district
British Jains
Spatial statisticians
Indian emigrants to England
Officers of the Order of the British Empire
British statisticians
Indian statisticians